Françoise Christophe (1923–2012) was a French film and television actress.

Partial filmography

 Premier rendez-vous (1941) - Une pensionnaire de l'orphelinat (uncredited)
 Mariage d'amour (1942) - La secrétaire
 Fantômas (1947) - La princesse Daniloff
 Une jeune fille savait (1948) - Jacqueline
 Carrefour du crime (1948) - Nelly
 Scandal on the Champs-Élysées (1949) - Françoise
 Mademoiselle de La Ferté (1949) - Galswinthe
 The Beautiful Image (1951) - Renée Cérusier
 Victor (1951) - Françoise Pélicier
 Leathernose (1952) - Judith de Rieusses
 Jouons le jeu (1952) - L'actrice (segment 'La fidélité')
 Les amours finissent à l'aube (1953) - Alberte Guéret
 A Free Woman (1954) - Liana Franci
 La rue des bouches peintes (1955) - Lady Blanche Wilburn / Lydia
 Walk Into Paradise (1956) - Dr. Louise Dumarcet
 The Possessors (1958) - Jacqueline Schoudler
 Testament of Orpheus (1960) - L'infirmière / The Nurse (uncredited)
 Three Faces of Sin (1961) - Une invitée au vernissage
 The Three Musketeers (1961) - Anne d'Autriche
 Erik the Conqueror (1961) - Regina Alice
 King of Hearts (1966) - La Duchesse
 Fantômas contre Scotland Yard (1967) - Lady Dorothy MacRashley
 Darling Caroline (1968) - Madame Chabanne
 Borsalino (1970) - Simone Escarguel
 Aussi loin que l'amour (1971) - La cliente
 Seven Deaths in the Cat's Eye (1973) - Lady Mary MacGrieff
 The Wings of the Dove (1981) - La mère de Marc
 Les pyramides bleues (1988) - Mother Superior
 Try This One for Size (1989) - Jenny
 Les amies de ma femme (1992) -La mère d'Edmée / Edmée's mother
 Fiesta (1965) - La douairière
 The Best Job in the World (1996) - Mme Davant, la mère d'Hélène
 Charmant garçon (2001) - Old lady in the park
 Hello Goodbye (2008) - La mère d'Alain (final film role)

References

Bibliography
 Goble, Alan. The Complete Index to Literary Sources in Film. Walter de Gruyter, 1999.

External links

1923 births
2012 deaths
French film actresses
Actresses from Paris